The Waitahaia River is a river in the Waiapu Valley of the Gisborne Region of New Zealand's North Island. Brown trout, a European species of fish, was introduced into New Zealand for fishing in the late 1860s.

See also
List of rivers of New Zealand

References

Rivers of the Gisborne District
Rivers of New Zealand